In Greek mythology, Agenor (Ancient Greek: Ἀγήνωρ or Αγήνορι Agēnor; English translation: 'heroic, manly') was a member of the royal house of Argos. He belonged to the house of Phoroneus, and was father of Crotopus. His exact position in the lineage varies depending on the source.

Biography 
Certain sources give Agenor as a son of Ecbasus, and, in some mythological traditions, father of the giant Argus Panoptes. In other accounts, Agenor was said to have been the son and successor of Triopas, and accordingly brother of Jasus, Xanthus and Pelasgus. Hellanicus of Lesbos states that Agenor was instead a son of Phoroneus, and (again) brother of Jasus and Pelasgus, and that after their father's death, the two elder brothers divided his dominions between themselves in such a manner that Pelasgus received the country about the river Erasmus, and built Larissa, and Jasus the country about Elis.  After the death of these two, Agenor, the youngest, invaded their dominions, and thus became king of Argos. Pausanias wrote that because of the enmity of Agenor, Trochilus, son of Callithyia and a priest of Demeter fled from Argos and settled in Attica where he married a woman from Eleusis.

Notes

References 

 Hyginus, Fabulae from The Myths of Hyginus translated and edited by Mary Grant. University of Kansas Publications in Humanistic Studies. Online version at the Topos Text Project.
 Pausanias, Description of Greece with an English Translation by W.H.S. Jones, Litt.D., and H.A. Ormerod, M.A., in 4 Volumes. Cambridge, MA, Harvard University Press; London, William Heinemann Ltd. 1918. . Online version at the Perseus Digital Library
Pausanias, Graeciae Descriptio. 3 vols. Leipzig, Teubner. 1903.  Greek text available at the Perseus Digital Library.
 Pseudo-Apollodorus, The Library with an English Translation by Sir James George Frazer, F.B.A., F.R.S. in 2 Volumes, Cambridge, MA, Harvard University Press; London, William Heinemann Ltd. 1921. . Online version at the Perseus Digital Library. Greek text available from the same website.

Princes in Greek mythology
Kings of Argos
Inachids